The 2021–22 Lake Superior State Lakers men's ice hockey season was the 56th season of play for the program, the 49th at the Division I level and the 42nd season in the CCHA conference. The Lakers represented Lake Superior State University and were coached by Damon Whitten, in his 8th season.

Season
Lake Superior State joined with six other members of the WCHA to restart the CCHA for the 2021–22 season.

The Lakers were hoping to build upon their first NCAA tournament appearance in 25 years with a strong performance. Unfortunately, they lost three critical games in the first two weeks. While they went undefeated in their succeeding seven games, the strength of their opponents kept them out of the polls. A bad stretch in November also cost Lake State and put the Lakers on the wrong side of .500.

The defense looked like it had recovered during a weekend split with top-ranked Minnesota State but then the offense flagged the following week against lowly Ferris State. The team went up and down in their play for several months but began to show a bit more consistency towards the end of the season. However, despite the improvement, Lake Superior was too far down the PairWise rankings to make the tournament without a conference championship.

Lake Superior began postseason play at home against Northern Michigan and laid an egg in the first game. The Lakers allowed the first five goals of the game and were only able to score with less than 5 minutes to play. They were much better in the rematch, winning 3–2 to tie the series and force a deciding rubber match. After surrendering the first goal, the Lakers reeled off three in a row to build a 3–1 lead early in the second period. Northern Michigan replied with a deluge of goals, scoring four times in the span of 8 minutes to take a commanding lead. Lake State was unable to add to their total for most of the third and were forced to pull Ethan Langenegger in desperation. The ploy worked once but the Wildcats managed to stop a tying goal from being scored and the Lakers' season was over.

Departures

Recruiting

Roster
As of August 20, 2021.

Standings

Schedule and results

|-
!colspan=12 style=";" | Regular Season

|-
!colspan=12 style=";" | 

|- align="center" bgcolor="#e0e0e0"
|colspan=12|Lake Superior State Lost Series 1–2

Scoring statistics

Goaltending statistics

Rankings

Note: USCHO did not release a poll in week 24.

Awards and honors

References

2021-22
Lake Superior State Lakers
Lake Superior State Lakers
Lake Superior State Lakers
Lake Superior State Lakers